Aggabodhi I was King of Anuradhapura in the 6th century, whose reign lasted from 564 to 598. He succeeded his cousin Maha Naga as King of Anuradhapura and was succeeded by his nephew Aggabodhi II.

See also
 List of Sri Lankan monarchs
 History of Sri Lanka

References

External links
 Kings & Rulers of Sri Lanka
 Codrington's Short History of Ceylon

Monarchs of Anuradhapura
A
A
A